Leadbitter may refer to:
Chris Leadbitter, English footballer
Daniel Leadbitter, English footballer
Eric Leadbitter, British soldier
Grant Leadbitter, English footballer
John Leadbitter, English footballer
Mike Leadbitter, British author
Ted Leadbitter, British politician
Tom Leadbitter, British racer